Huyền Quang (玄光), 1254–1334, his real name is Lý Đạo Tái (李道載), he was born in Vạn Tải village,  Nam Sách District, Lạng Giang. Now it is Vạn Tải village, Thái Bảo commune, Gia Bình district, Bắc Ninh province. He was very knowledgeable, passed both Hương examination and Hội examination. He passed the Zhuangyuan exam in 1272 or 1274 and was appointed to work in the Imperial House Institute of the court. After the resignation, he followed Trần Nhân Tông to Trúc Lâm. As a Vietnamese Thiền Buddhist monk, the third Trúc Lâm Yên Tử. He was a great poet with many preserved poems. Along with  Trần Nhân Tông  and Pháp Loa, he is considered a great Thiền Buddhist master of Vietnam and it is considered as both of them as equal to the Six patriarchs of Zen Buddhism or the 28 Patriarchs of Indian Meditation.

Trần dynasty Buddhist monks
Thiền Buddhists
1254 births
1334 deaths